Patrick Lyon may refer to:

Patrick Lyon, 1st Lord Glamis (1402–1459), Scottish nobleman
Patrick Lyon, 3rd Earl of Strathmore and Kinghorne (1643–1695), Scottish peer and nobleman
Patrick Lyon of Auchterhouse (1669–1715), his son
Patrick Lyon, 1st Earl of Kinghorne (c. 1575–1615), Scottish landowner
Patrick Lyon (blacksmith) (1769–1829), Scottish-born American blacksmith and builder of hand-pumped fire engines

See also
Patrick Bowes-Lyon (1863–1946), British tennis player and barrister 
Patrick Bowes-Lyon, 15th Earl of Strathmore and Kinghorne (1884–1949), British nobleman
Patrick Lyons (disambiguation)